Bani Bid (also Romanized as Bānī Bīd; also known as Bān Bīd and Bānbīl) is a village in Qalkhani Rural District, Gahvareh District, Dalahu County, Kermanshah Province, Iran. At the 2006 census, its population was 295, in 65 families.

References 

Populated places in Dalahu County